Eagle Island State Park may refer to:

Eagle Island State Park (Idaho)
Eagle Island State Park (Washington)